was a village located in Higashiusuki District, Miyazaki Prefecture, Japan.

As of 2003, the village had an estimated population of 2,479 and the density of 13.03 persons per km². The total area was 190.23 km².

On January 1, 2006, Nangō, along with the villages of Kitagō and Saigō (all from Higashiusuki District), was merged to create the town of Misato and no longer exists as an independent municipality.

Nango literally means "south shire". This village was a southern quarter of so-called Irigo (literally Inlands Shire) area.

History
The village was established in 1889 by merging the villages (now hamlets) Kamidogawa, Nakadogawa, Mizushidani, Kijino and Mikado.

External links
 Official website of Misato  
 Official website of Nangō 

Dissolved municipalities of Miyazaki Prefecture